South Africa competed at the 1994 Winter Olympics in Lillehammer, Norway. These were the first Winter Olympic games South Africa competed in since the 1960 Winter Olympics at Squaw Valley, California.

Flag, anthem and team logo
As the design for a new post-apartheid flag had yet to be finalised, the team used a white banner charged with the emblem of Olympic Committee of South Africa, which depicted Olympic rings surrounded by olive branches, with the name of the country above.

Competitors
The following is the list of number of competitors in the Games.

Figure skating

Men

Short track speed skating 

Women

References

Official Olympic Reports

Nations at the 1994 Winter Olympics
1994
1994 in South African sport